L. Edward Miller   was an American professional baseball player who played outfield in the American Association for the 1884 Toledo Blue Stockings.

External links

Toledo Blue Stockings players
19th-century baseball players
Major League Baseball outfielders
Baseball players from Michigan
Muskegon (minor league baseball) players
Terre Haute (minor league baseball) players
Peoria Reds players
People from Tecumseh, Michigan